Philemon may refer to:

In the Bible
 Epistle to Philemon, a book in the New Testament
 Philemon (biblical figure), recipient of Saint Paul's Epistle to Philemon

Arts and entertainment
 Philémon (comics), a Franco-Belgian comic book series by Fred
 Philemon (musical), a 1975 off-Broadway musical by Tom Jones and Harvey Schmidt
 Philemon Arthur and the Dung, a music group from Scania, Sweden, consisting of two members, whose real names are unknown
 Philemon, a character from the Persona video game series

People
Helen Philemon (born 1980), track and field athlete from Papua New Guinea
Philemon (given name), a list of people with the given name
Philemon (poet), an Athenian poet and playwright of the New Comedy
Philemon (geographer), an Ancient Greek geographer of the 1st century AD

Other
 Baucis and Philemon, the couple from the Metamorphoses of Greek mythology
 Philemon, a wise spirit guide in The Red Book, by Carl Jung
 Philemon Foundation, a non-profit organization for publication of the complete works of Carl Gustav Jung
 Philemon Ministries, a Kenyan prison ministry charity founded by Kelvin Mwikya
 Philemon (bird), a genus of birds in the family Meliphagidae

See also
 Filemón Pi, a Spanish comic book character
 The Adventures of Filemon the Cat (The Adventures of Filemon the Cat), the title character in a Polish animated cartoon